Twin Mounds may refer to:
 Twin Mounds Archeological District, a U.S. historic district east of Sorrento, Florida
 Twin Mounds Site, a Mississippian culture archaeological site near Barlow, Kentucky
 Twin Mounds, a double-conical burial mound at Pinson Mounds in Madison County, Tennessee

See also
 Twin Mound, Kansas, a townsite in western Douglas County, Kansas